Lauren Michele Jackson (born 1991) is an American culture critic and assistant professor of English and African American studies at Northwestern University. Her first book, White Negroes (2019), is a nonfiction collection of essays that explores cultural appropriation.

Career 
Jackson attended University of Illinois at Urbana-Champaign for her bachelor's degree. She received her doctoral degree in English Language and Literature from University of Chicago. Her dissertation is titled "Black Vertigo: Nausea, Aphasia, and Bodily Noise, 1970s to the present." In 2019, Jackson was hired at Northwestern University as an assistant professor in the departments of English and African American studies.

Jackson began freelance writing when she was a doctoral student. She has written for Vulture, The Paris Review, and The New Yorker, among others.

Jackson's debut book, White Negroes: Cornrows Were in Vogue... and Other Thoughts on Cultural Appropriation "explores how appropriation manifests in music, art, memes, and more." It was published by Beacon Press in November 2019. The title was inspired by the 1957 Norman Mailer essay "The White Negro". Reviewing the book for Vox, Alanna Okun wrote, "Using case studies ranging from the Kardashians to Miley Cyrus to Paula Deen to Big Dick Energy, she explores and pinpoints the term with nuance, curiosity, and wryness."

She was named a contributing writer for The New Yorker in September 2020.

Works 
 White Negroes: Cornrows Were in Vogue... and Other Thoughts on Cultural Appropriation (2019), Beacon Press;

Further reading 
 "Drake's Playground" (January 12, 2016) on TheAwl.com

References

External links 
Official website
Faculty page on Northwestern.edu

1991 births
Living people
African-American women academics
American women academics
African-American academics
African-American women writers
American critics
University of Illinois Urbana-Champaign alumni
University of Chicago alumni
Northwestern University faculty
21st-century African-American women
The New Yorker people